Live at Get Your Aunty On! is the second live album and overall the third album by the Pakistani indie rock band, Aunty Disco Project, released on August 16, 2009. It is exclusively a digital download live album, and has not been released on a physical medium. The album included recordings from the band's live performances at Get Your Aunty On! concert at Rangoonwala Auditorium held in Karachi, Sindh.

Track listing
All music written, composed & arranged by Aunty Disco Project. "Rock the Casbah" was originally recorded by The Clash.

Personnel
All information is taken from the CD.

Aunty Disco Project
Omar Bilal Akhtar - vocals, lead guitar
Giles Goveas - drums
Ali Alam - vocals, rhythm guitar
Rahail Siddiqui - bass, backing vocals

Production
Produced by Aunty Disco Project
Recorded & Mixed at Rangoonwala Auditorium in Karachi, Pakistan

References

External links
Official website
Official blog
Aunty Disco Project at YouTube

2009 live albums
Aunty Disco Project albums
Urdu-language albums